Ashley John Barsley Hunter (1854–1932) was a New Zealand engineer, artist, photographer and cartoonist. Although principally employed as an engineer, his cartoons appeared in the New Zealand Graphic, Ladies Journal and Youth Companion (1890–1913) in the 1890s and 1900s.

Biography 
Hunter was born in England before moving to New Zealand in 1871 with his family. He married a woman by the name of Eliza Jane Halyday in 1878, and eventually passed away in Auckland in 1932.

After working as a photographer upon arrival in New Zealand, Hunter was appointed to an engineering cadet in the Public Works Department in Wellington (1872.) He continued to work for the Public Works Department until 1882, when he went into a private practice in partnership with James Stewart. Hunter then went on to become an engineer for the Westport Coal Company (1894-1897), the Paparoa Coal Company (1906–1910), the Waipa Coal Company and the Westport Stockton Coal Company (1910–1913). In 1918, he was responsible for laying out the Glen Afton Coal Mine and the Huntly Branch Railway.

He was a member of the UK Institution of Civil Engineers and President of the New Zealand Society of Civil Engineers from 1922 to 1923.

External links 
View material relating to Ashley Hunter on DigitalNZ

References 

1854 births
English emigrants to New Zealand
New Zealand cartoonists
New Zealand photographers
1932 deaths